Senator Hughes may refer to:

United States Senate members
Charles J. Hughes Jr. (1853–1911), U.S. Senator from Colorado from 1909 to 1911
Harold Hughes (1922–1996), U.S. Senator from Iowa from 1969 until 1975
James H. Hughes (1867–1953), U.S. Senator from Delaware from 1937 to 1943
William Hughes (U.S. senator) (1872–1918), U.S. Senator from New Jersey from 1913 to 1918

United States state senate members
Bryan Hughes (politician) (born 1969), Texas State Senate
Charles Hughes (representative) (1822–1887), New York State Senate
Dan Hughes (Nebraska politician) (born 1956), Nebraska State Senate
Dudley Mays Hughes (1848–1927), Georgia State Senate
Edward J. Hughes Jr. (fl. 1970s), New Jersey State Senate
Edward J. Hughes (1888–1944), Illinois State Senate
Francis Wade Hughes (1817–1885), Pennsylvania State Senate
Harry Hughes (1926–2019), Maryland State Senate
Henry Hughes (sociologist) (1829–1862), Mississippi State Senate
James A. Hughes (1861–1930), West Virginia State Senate
Jerome M. Hughes (1929–2015), Minnesota State Senate
Jim Hughes (politician) (born 1964), Ohio State Senate
John H. Hughes (politician) (1904–1972), New York State Senate
Mildred Barry Hughes (1902–1995), New Jersey State Senate
Ralph M. Hughes (born 1948), Maryland State Senate
Shelley Hughes (born 1958), Alaska State Senate
Teresa Patterson Hughes (1932–2011), California State Senate
Vincent Hughes (born 1956), Pennsylvania State Senate